Sofia Oxenham is an English television actress. She played Tess Tregidden on the BBC One series Poldark and plays Carrie on the Disney+ series Extraordinary.

Early life
Oxenham has an Australian father and  Cornish mother, and two brothers and a sister. She grew up in Devon before the family moved to Trebetherick in Cornwall when she was a teenager. She worked for a local waterski company in Rock, Cornwall during her summer holidays. 

Oxenham was a keen actress and participated in school plays and local amateur dramatic productions in Cornwall. Twice she reached the final round of RADA interviews without becoming a successful applicant. She moved to London and worked as a runner on a film set and got paid to perform at children parties before a third application was successful. She graduated from RADA in 2017.

Career
Oxenham's television roles have included playing series 5 regular Tess Tregidden on BBC One’s series Poldark. She also had a recurring role as Eydis on Netflix series Cursed, as well as having parts on Doc Martin, Dracula, Soulmates, and Grantchester.

In 2023 Oxenham was first seen in the lead role of Carrie in the Disney+ superhero comedy series Extraordinary. Carrie has the ability to communicate with spirits from beyond the world of living. She told Collider that she laughed out-loud at the scripts that felt “fresh and different” and to be part of the show was a “golden opportunity”. Oxenham described it as the first comedic role she had ever performed. Mike Hale in The New York Times praised her for the communicating beyond the grave scenes which “a lip-syncing Oxenham does to great comic effect”. The show was well received and renewed for a second season by Disney+ in January 2023.

Filmography

References

External links

English television actresses
Living people
Actresses from Cornwall
Date of birth unknown
Alumni of RADA
21st-century English actresses
English people of Australian descent